was a  after Daidō and before Tenchō. This period spanned the years from September 810  through January 824.

Change of era
 February 9, 810 : The new era name was created to mark an event or series of events. The previous era ended and the new one commenced in Daidō 4, on the 27th day of the 9th month of 810.

Events of the Kōnin era
 May 30, 823 (Kōnin 14, 17th day of the 4th month): In the 14th year of Emperor Saga's reign (嵯峨天皇14年), he abdicated; and the succession (senso) was received by his younger brother, Emperor Kammu's third son. Shortly thereafter, Emperor Junna is said to have acceded to the throne.(sokui).

Notes

References
 Brown, Delmer M. and Ichirō Ishida, eds. (1979).  Gukanshō: The Future and the Past. Berkeley: University of California Press. ;  OCLC 251325323
 Nussbaum, Louis-Frédéric and Käthe Roth. (2005).  Japan encyclopedia. Cambridge: Harvard University Press. ;  OCLC 58053128
 Titsingh, Isaac. (1834). Nihon Odai Ichiran; ou,  Annales des empereurs du Japon.  Paris: Royal Asiatic Society, Oriental Translation Fund of Great Britain and Ireland. OCLC 5850691
 Varley, H. Paul. (1980). A Chronicle of Gods and Sovereigns: Jinnō Shōtōki of Kitabatake Chikafusa. New York: Columbia University Press. ;  OCLC 6042764

External links 
National Diet Library, "The Japanese Calendar" -- historical overview plus illustrative images from library's collection

Japanese eras
9th century in Japan
810 beginnings
824 endings